New Zealand played two Test matches and two Twenty20 Internationals (T20Is) in India as part of their preparations for the ICC World T20 in September in Sri Lanka. The series started with a Test match on 23 August 2012 and ended with a T20I on 11 September 2012.

Test series

1st Test

2nd Test

T20I series

1st T20I

2nd T20I

References

External links 
 

2012 in Indian cricket
2012 in New Zealand cricket
Indian cricket seasons from 2000–01
International cricket competitions in 2012
2012